The Tala River is a river of western Seram Island, Maluku province, Indonesia, about 2400 km northeast of the capital Jakarta.

History
According to the Central Maluku legend, the three rivers: Eti River, Tala River and Sapalewa River, flow from a sacred lake on the mountain peak called "Nunusaku". There grows a ficus tree with three big roots, each stretching in the direction of the abovementioned rivers, and this is the place of origin of the native people in Seram island, the so-called "Alifuru" people, who later inhabit the surrounding islands. The three rivers are known in local language as Kwele Batai Telu or Kwalai Batai Telu ("three stream branches"; Indonesian: "Tiga Ruas Sungai") watering the island of Seram (Nusa Ina). "Nunusaku" (which was a lost great kingdom according to legends) is a term consisting of two words: "nunu" or "nunue" (ficus tree), and "saku" (truth). This place is located in the area of Manusa-Manue and considered impassable by humans. Alune and Wemale people live in the watershed areas of the three rivers: Alune people inhabit the whole area of the Eti river, mountainous area of Tala river and most of the coastal area of Sapalewa river, whereas Wemale people occupy the area east of Tala and Sapalewa rivers.

Hydrology
It is one of the three main basins of the western side of Seram. The river flows southwards, and empties into El-Paputih Bay on the southwest coast of the island.

Geography
The river flows in the western area of Seram island with predominantly tropical rainforest climate (designated as Af in the Köppen-Geiger climate classification). The annual average temperature in the area is 22 °C. The warmest month is March, when the average temperature is around 24 °C, and the coldest is June, at 20 °C. The average annual rainfall is 3349 mm. The wettest month is July, with an average of 442 mm rainfall, and the driest is October, with 112 mm rainfall.

See also
List of rivers of Indonesia
List of rivers of Maluku (province)

References

Rivers of Seram Island
Rivers of Indonesia